Myroslav Frankovych Marynovych (born 4 January 1949, Komarovychi, Staryi Sambir Raion) is a vice-rector of the Ukrainian Catholic University in Lviv, social activist, co-founder of Amnesty International Ukraine, and a founding member of the Ukrainian Helsinki Group.

Biography

Early life 
Marynovych was born on January 4, 1949, in the village of Komarovychi of Starosambirsky district of Drohobych Oblast (now Lviv Oblast). His grandfather was a priest of the Ukrainian Greek Catholic Church and his family was very religious.  In Drohobych he attended high school, from which he graduated with a gold medal. Then he worked as a secretary at the plant in Drohobych for a year.

In 1967, Myroslav Marynovych began studying at the Lviv Polytechnic Institute. In the Institute he spoke out against the Soviet regime which did not uphold the ideals of Communism. As a result of this, the first meeting with the KGB took place in 1970.

Career 
In 1972 he graduated from Lviv Polytechnic and worked as a translator for English at the Ivano-Frankivsk plant "Positron". At the same time he met with dissidents from Lviv and Kyiv. On May 22, 1973, he was arrested and searched by police in Kyiv when he laid flowers at the monument to Taras Shevchenko.

Afterwards he was conscripted into the Soviet Army, where he served from 1973 to 1974 in Vologda.

After his release from the army, Marynovych moved to Kyiv in 1974. He worked as a technical editor for the magazine pochatkova shkola (Elementary school) and at publishing house Tekhnika, where he was fired by KGB order. He was unemployed for some time. Before the arrest, he arranged to stick posters.

Prison-Time 
In 1976, Marynovych met Mykola Matusevych, and became a founding member of the Ukrainian Helsinki Group. Since then he was repeatedly detained by police in Kyiv and Serpukhov. Searches were conducted in Drohobych, and he was constantly threatened. Eventually, because of their membership, Marynovych and Matusevych were arrested on April 23, 1977, for Anti-Soviet Agitation and Propaganda. At the trial and sentencing he denied any guilt. After 11 months he was finally convicted and sentenced to the maximum term - 7 years of severe security camps and 5 years in exile.

Marynovych was in the Perm camp of VS-389/36-2 in Permskaya district. There he took part in all human rights actions, held hunger strikes, including a 20-day protest, and narrated a camp chronicle. For the whole term he had about 150 days of ShIZO (Penalty Insulator). In 1978, Amnesty International took Marynovych under its protection as a prisoner of conscience. From April 1984, Marynovych was exiled to the village of Saralzhin in the Oiyl District of Aktobe region of Kazakhstan, where he worked as a carpenter. He married Lyuba Kheina,  who travelled from Kyiv to join him in exile.

Later activities 
In 1987, he returned to western Ukraine, and worked in an oil refinery in Drohobych. He also worked as a reporter in the local newspaper, Halytska Zorya (The Star of Halych; Ukrainian: Галицька Зоря).

Also in 1991 Marynovych founded the first Amnesty International group in the USSR and served as its head till 1996. From 1993 to 1997 he served as chairperson of the National Committee.

From 1997 - 2007 he served as Director of the Institute of Religion and Society of Lviv Theological Academy (later UCU), and was member of the Ukrainian Theological Scientific Society.

From 2000 - 2005 he served as Vice Rector of the Ukrainian Catholic University for External Affairs.

Since 2007 he is the President of the Institute of Religion and Society, UCU.

In 2010 he became the president of the Ukrainian Centre of PEN International and serves till now as honorary president.

Publications
Marynovych's first published work came out in 1990, titled The Gospel According to God's Fool. This work had been written while he was serving in exile, and was later translated into German and French.

In 1991, his second work was published, entitled Ukraine on the Margins of the Holy Scripture (Ukrainian: Україна на полі Святого Письма).

In 1993 - "The Atonement of Communism", "Ukraine: Road through the Desert".

Books
 
 
 
 Translation of 2016 Ukrainian-language version.

Awards
Among his awards, Myroslav Marynovych received a prize from the journal Suchasnist  (“Modernity”) for his political science report “Atoning for Communism” (1993), the Valerii Marchenko award from the Ukrainian-American Bureau for Protection of Human Rights for the best human rights publication (1995), the Vladimir Zhabotinsky Medal for the promotion of inter-ethnic understanding from the Ukraine-Israel Society (1999), the Sergio Vieira de Mello Humanitarian Award (2013), and the Truman-Reagan Medal of Freedom (2014).

Myroslav Marynovych has received many educational awards, including fellowships at Columbia University (USA), the World Council of Churches (Switzerland), and the Catholic University of Nijmegen (The Netherlands).

State awards
 The Order of Liberty (2008)
 The First Class of the Order For Courage (2006)

Video
 
LECTURE: "CONTEMPORARY UKRAINE: TRANSFORMATION UNDER FIRE" WITH MYROSLAV MARYNOVYCH
Myroslav Marynovych received the Truman-Reagan Medal of Freedom in Washington, D.C.
Victims of Communism Memorial Foundation, Witness Project: Myroslav Marynovych
Witness Project: Myroslav Marynovich (Full Interview)
Columbia University, Myroslav Marynovych "Moral Aspects of the Dissident Resistance in Ukraine: From Rosy Expectations to Sober Reality"
Bohdan Havrylyshyn Charity Foundation, “Truth, Freedom, National Identity” by Myroslav Marynovych

References

1949 births
Living people
People from Lviv Oblast
Lviv Polytechnic alumni
Soviet dissidents
Ukrainian dissidents
Soviet human rights activists
Ukrainian human rights activists
Ukrainian Helsinki Group
Chevaliers of the Order For Courage, 1st class
Knights of the Order of Merit of the Republic of Poland
Recipients of the Vasyl Stus Prize
Academic staff of Ukrainian Catholic University
Amnesty International people